The 2006 London tornado was a significant United Kingdom tornado spawned from a squall line moving over the city on 7 December 2006 at approximately 11:02 GMT. Its intensity is estimated to have been T4 on the TORRO scale, equating to F2 on the Fujita scale.

Meteorological synopsis
On the morning of 7 December, the UK was under the influence of a strong Atlantic Ocean low pressure system, which was named Ulrike, bringing unstable weather conditions to much of the UK, and the south in particular. At approximately 07:30 GMT, a small band of thunderstorms initialised over Cornwall moving east-northeast across the country. By approximately 10:00 am, the squall line had reached Salisbury, where a drop in humidity was recorded, which may have resulted in an increase of atmospheric pressure behind the squall, causing it to accelerate forward. This increased motion in combination with a change in wind direction ahead of the storm may have initialised the rotation of the mesocyclone in one of the now strong storm cells, resulting in the touchdown of the T4 tornado in Kensal Rise, London, at 11 am.

Aftermath
The London Fire Brigade and structural surveyors assessed the damage and structural safety of affected properties. In the meantime, several hundred people were displaced from their homes until they had been declared safe for their occupants to return. Brent London Borough Council, speaking to a national newspaper, announced that none of the affected properties are likely to be demolished, though a total of 29 homes have been declared as unfit for habitation due to the damage caused by the tornado.

See also
 List of European tornadoes and tornado outbreaks
 Tornadoes of 2006
 1981 United Kingdom tornado outbreak

References

External links
 Six hurt as tornado hits London  – BBC News
 

Tornado
December 2006 events in the United Kingdom
L
F2 tornadoes
History of the London Borough of Brent
Tornadoes in the United Kingdom
Tornadoes of 2006
Weather events in England